Vertault is a commune in the Côte-d'Or department in eastern France.
The ancient Gallo-Roman settlement of Vertillum lies just west of the village. Of particular note is its Vertault relief.

Population

See also
Communes of the Côte-d'Or department

References

Communes of Côte-d'Or
Lingones